Daniel Bruce Klein (born January 16, 1962) is an American professor of economics at George Mason University and an Associate Fellow of the Swedish Ratio Institute.  Much of his research examines the works of Adam Smith, public policy questions, libertarian political philosophy, and the sociology of academia.  He is the chief editor of Econ Journal Watch.

Klein received his doctorate in economics from New York University in 1990. He was a visiting scholar at the City University in Stockholm
and the Department of Economics, Stanford University.

Debates
In an article appearing in the August 2004 Econ Journal Watch he criticized libertarian paternalism, espoused by Cass Sunstein and Richard Thaler, as oxymoronic. He argued against what he perceived as an overly loose and weak definition of libertarianism on the grounds that Thaler and Sunstein made no meaningful distinction between liberty and coercion. In failing to define the concepts of liberty and coercion as fundamentally dissimilar processes. Libertarian paternalism uses a hyperrational behavior model of human nature as a definition for libertarianism, and neglects alternative definitions such as those advanced by Adam Smith and F.A. Hayek.

Selected publications
 "The Voluntary Provision of Public Goods?: The Turnpike Companies of Early America" in Economic Inquiry vol. 28 (1990)
 "Promise Keeping in the Great Society: A Model of Credit Information Sharing" in Economics and Politics vol. 4 (1992)
 Curb Rights: A Foundation for Free Enterprise in Urban Transit (co-authored with Adrian T. Moore and Binyam Reja) (1997)
 "Discovery and the Deepself" in Review of Austrian Economics vol. 11 (1999)
 "The Demand for and Supply of Assurance" in Economic Affairs vol. 21 (2001)
 "Economists' Policy Views and Voting" (co-authored with Charlotta Stern) in Public Choice vol. 126 (2006)
 "I Was Wrong, and So Are You" in The Atlantic vol. 307 (2011)
 Knowledge and Coordination: A Liberal Interpretation (2012)

Notes

External links
 Klein's bio at the Mercatus Center
 Klein's website at GMU
 Econ Journal Watch
 

1962 births
Living people
21st-century American economists
American male non-fiction writers
American people of Dutch descent
George Mason University faculty
Libertarian theorists
Cato Institute people